Sprüngli may refer to:

 Confiserie Sprüngli, a Swiss luxury confectionery manufacturer known for its "Luxemburgerli" macaroons
 Lindt & Sprüngli AG, more commonly known as Lindt, a Swiss chocolate and confectionery company
 Anna Rüling, the pseudonym of Theodora "Theo" Anna Sprüngli (1880 – 1953), German journalist and lesbian activist